The Arkansas Tech Wonder Boys and Golden Suns are the athletic teams that represent Arkansas Tech University in Russellville, Arkansas. They are a charter member of the Great American Conference of the NCAA Division II.

Sports sponsored
Arkansas Tech currently fields 10 sports at the NCAA Division II level.

Wonder Boys sports

Football
John Tucker is ultimately responsible for the idiosyncratic nickname "Wonder Boys" for Arkansas Tech University. On November 15, 1919, Tucker, as a 17-year-old freshman, scored two touchdowns and kicked two extra points to lead the Second District Agricultural School Aggies to a 14–0 upset win over Jonesboro. In newspaper accounts following the game, Tucker and his teammates were referred to as "Wonder Boys," and the nickname remains to this day. Tucker was labeled as "The Original Wonder Boy" and was associated with the school for the rest of his life. He went on to play on the University of Alabama's Rose Bowl team in 1931 and served Arkansas Tech in a variety of roles – including coach, athletic director and chemistry professor – between 1925 and 1972. Two buildings on the Tech campus – Tucker Coliseum and Tucker Hall – are named in his honor.

Originally the Second District Agricultural School when formed in 1909, Arkansas Tech has made five appearances in football national playoffs (1971, 1994, 1999, 2004 and 2009). Led by All-American receiver Rick Thone, the 1971 Wonder Boys (12–1–0) made it to the national championship game of the NAIA playoffs, losing to Livingston State (now University of West Alabama) in the title game, 14–12, played in Birmingham, AL. In 1994, Tech lost in the first round of the NAIA playoffs to Langston (OK), 56–42, after capturing the final Arkansas Intercollegiate Conference (AIC) football crown earlier that season. Firman W. Bynum, long-time Dean of Men at Tech, was the school's first All-American football player in 1939.

Tech won AIC football championships in 1931, 1935, 1939, 1945, 1946, 1947, 1948, 1949, 1954, 1958, 1960, 1961, 1964, 1968, 1970, 1971 and 1994.

Arkansas Tech left the NAIA after the AIC disbanded following the 1994–95 academic year. Tech joined NCAA Division II and the Gulf South Conference at that time. Since then, Tech's football program has made appearances in the NCAA Division II Playoffs in 1999, 2004 and 2009. The 1999 team was the first from Arkansas to win the GSC football championship outright, while the 2004 Wonder Boys were the first team from Arkansas to host or win an NCAA Division II Playoffs game. Tech earned that honor by defeating Catawba College (N.C.) 24–20 on November 13, 2004. The Wonder Boys returned to the NCAA Division II Playoffs in 2009 and defeated the University of North Carolina at Pembroke 41–13 in the first round before falling to University of North Alabama 41–28 in the region semifinals.

Steve Mullins served as head football coach at Arkansas Tech from 1997 through 2012. Raymond Monica became head football for the 2013 season. Mullins holds the school record for most wins as the Tech head football coach (96). Mullins has also served as athletic director since April 16, 2003.

Conference affiliations
 Independent (1911–1928, 1956–1957)
 Arkansas Intercollegiate Conference (1929–1955, 1958–1994)
 Gulf South Conference (1995–2010)
 Great American Conference (2011–present)

Basketball
Tech's greatest men's basketball success came under the guidance of head coach Sam Hindsman, who led the Wonder Boys from 1947–66. Hindsman, who also won two AIC football titles at Tech during the 1950s, was ahead of his time with an up-tempo style that dazzled fans and opponents. Hindsman and the Wonder Boys won seven consecutive AIC basketball titles from 1949–55. In 1954 and 1955, Tech reached the semifinals of the NAIA National Tournament. Tech's only other NAIA Final Four berth in men's basketball came in 1995.

In all, Hindsman won 11 conference men's basketball titles and 355 men's basketball games to set school records that are unlikely to ever be eclipsed.

Tech returned to men's basketball prominence for the first time in more than a decade during the 2008–09 season. The Wonder Boys finished 23–9 overall, won their first-ever Gulf South Conference men's basketball title and qualified for the NCAA Division II Tournament in men's basketball for the first time ever. The Wonder Boys defeated Benedict College 63–62 in their first-ever NCAA tournament game on March 14, 2009. Florida Southern ended Tech's season 95–92 in overtime the following evening.

The Wonder Boys won their second consecutive GSC Tournament title in 2010 and they returned to the NCAA Division II Basketball Tournament in both 2010 and 2011, reaching the regional semifinals on both occasions.

Baseball
Tech won AIC baseball titles in 1950, 1964, 1976, 1981, 1985, 1988, and 1992. The Wonder Boys captured a share of the GSC West Division baseball crown in 1998. Tech won a school record 44 games in 2014 while winning the Great American Conference championship.

Golf
Arkansas Tech's men's golf team was AIC champions in 1966, 1967, 1968, 1969, 1970, 1984, 1992, 1993, 1994 and 1995. Tech became the first school from Arkansas to win the GSC Championship in men's golf in 2004. The 1998 Wonder Boys reached the NCAA Division II National Tournament for men's golf. Tech made its sixth men's golf NCAA Division II Regional Tournament appearance and finished as GSC Tournament runner-up in 2009. Bill Bailey was a four-time All-AIC selectee in golf (1973–76). In 2021, the Wonder Boys won the NCAA Division II men's golf national championship, which was the third national championship won by an Arkansas Tech team, and the first for any Wonder Boys teams.

Golden Suns sports

Cross country

Volleyball
The Golden Suns volleyball program won AIC titles in 1983, 1984, 1985 and 1987. The Suns captured GSC West Division volleyball crowns in 1997, 1999, 2000, 2008 and 2010. The 2000 team became the first from Arkansas Tech to qualify for the NCAA Division II Volleyball Tournament.

Basketball
Arkansas Tech's two greatest moments of athletic glory were provided by the back-to-back NAIA Division I national championships captured by the Golden Suns basketball program in 1992 and 1993. The 1991–92 team finished with an overall record of 35–1. The 1991–92 Golden Suns won each of their final 28 games by 12 points or more, including an 84–68 win over Wayland Baptist University (Texas) in the national championship game. The Suns won their second consecutive national crown in 1993 by defeating Union University (Tenn.) 76–75. Joe Foley, Tech head women's basketball coach from 1987–2003, was the architect of both national championship teams.

Today, the Golden Suns basketball program ranks among the top five in NCAA Division II history in winning percentage and all-time wins. The Suns finished as NCAA Division II national runners-up in 1999, and they made it back to the NCAA Division II Tournament for the first time in three years during the 2006–07 season. Tech made it back-to-back trips to the NCAA tournament when the Suns qualified for the event again in 2008. Arkansas Tech captured consecutive NCAA Division II South Region titles and back-to-back GSC Tournament championships in women's basketball in 2010 and 2011.

Golf
Arkansas Tech won its first GSC championship in women's golf during the 2010–11 season.

Softball
Arkansas Tech won GSC West Division softball championships in 2008 and 2009 and finished as GSC softball tournament runner-up in both 2008 and 2009.

Tennis
The Golden Suns tennis program made four consecutive GSC Tournament appearances in from 2008–11 and established a new school record for tennis victories in a season (17) during the 2009 campaign.

Notable athletes
 Tanner Marsh, Former Canadian Football League quarterback for the Montreal Alouettes.
 David Bevis, former professional basketball player.
 Ed Meador, former NFL defensive back for the Los Angeles Rams

References

External links